Mt. Tabor Baptist Church, also known as Big Levels Baptist Church, Lewisburg Baptist Church, and Mount Tabor Church, is a historic Baptist church at Court and Foster Streets in Lewisburg, Greenbrier County, West Virginia. It was built in 1832, and is a -story, brick meeting house building with Gothic style design elements.  It measures 36 feet long by 40 feet wide and sits on a thick limestone foundation.  It features a 10 feet by 16 feet frame tower, topped with an octagonal cap and belfry.

It was listed on the National Register of Historic Places in 1976.

References

Churches on the National Register of Historic Places in West Virginia
Baptist churches in West Virginia
Buildings and structures in Greenbrier County, West Virginia
National Register of Historic Places in Greenbrier County, West Virginia
Churches completed in 1832
Gothic Revival church buildings in West Virginia